Mundy Hepburn is an American artist who designs and builds glass sculptures filled with luminous electrified inert gases—the same technology used in neon signs.  Hepburn developed many of the glass and lighting techniques he uses in his sculptures himself.  

Hepburn lives in Old Saybrook, Connecticut.  He is the nephew of actress Katharine Hepburn.

External links
 Official site
 1989 New York Times article on the Neon Garage
 Neon Garage photos
 Art Knowledge News article

American sculptors
American glass artists
Neon lighting
Living people
Year of birth missing (living people)
People from Old Saybrook, Connecticut